Guioa oligotricha is a species of plant in the family Sapindaceae. It is found in New Guinea.

References

oligotricha
Trees of New Guinea
Vulnerable plants
Taxonomy articles created by Polbot